Lucky Sherpa a politician and social activist of Nepal, a former Nepal ambassador for Australia and New Zealand is the first indigenous women and first Himalayan communities to be appointed as an ambassador by Nepal Government. Nepal government sacked her amid serious allegation of human trafficking by her own former driver Wangchu Sherpa. Though Nepal government formed a committee for investigation, she has not get clearance from the allegation.

Sherpa was the elected member of the Constituent Assembly and Parliament of Nepal (from 2008 to 2012). While in Parliament, Sherpa was a legislative member of International Relations and Human Rights Community under the Legislative Parliament. Her role been highly acknowledged by women and indigenous communities of Nepal in parliament for institutionalizing the inclusive participation of excluded communities in mainstream politics. As a strong advocate of federalism, Sherpa deliberately lobbied to institutionalize the federalism in new constitution during her tenure as a constituent assembly member in first constituent assembly.

Ms. Sherpa has led the Parliamentarians Network on Environment that is GLOBE Nepal, a member organization of Globe International. She is also an International Steering Committee member of the Climate Vulnerable Countries network. She promotes green development, inclusive democracy, human rights and the rule of law.

Sherpa was honored with the recognition of ‘Youth Ambassador' for Peace for 2007 and ‘Young Women Human Rights Leader’ by the World Youth Federation for Peace, Korea and MADRE, an International Women's Human Rights Organization in USA respectively.

She was the first female graduate from the indigenous Sherpa community to hold a master's degree in Economics and was the faculty's top student for 2001 from Patan Campus of Tribhuvan University. Ms Sherpa has participated in many international trainings provided by ILO, UNDP and a very recent program at Harvard University on Political Leadership organized by the US Embassy in Nepal and the Karuna Center for Peace Building in Washington D.C.

References

Living people
Ambassadors of Nepal to Australia
Date of birth missing (living people)
Nepalese women diplomats
Year of birth missing (living people)
Nepalese women ambassadors
People from Sunsari District